Wizard, the wizard, or wizards may refer to:

 Wizard (fantasy), a fictional practitioner of magic
 Wizard (supernatural), a practitioner of magic

Art, entertainment and media

Fictional characters 
 Wizard (Archie Comics), a comic book superhero
 Wizard (character class), magic-wielding character types in many role-playing games
 Wizard (DC Comics), a comic book villain
 Wizard (Dungeons & Dragons), the Dungeons & Dragons character class
 Wizard (Marvel Comics), a comic book villain
 Wizard (Middle-earth), powerful beings in the writings of J. R. R. Tolkien
"The Wizard", the villain of the serial Batman and Robin
 Wizard of Oz (character), in L. Frank Baum's novel The Wonderful Wizard of Oz and its movie adaptations
 Wizards (Discworld), major characters in Terry Pratchett's Discworld series

Film 
 The Wizard (1927 film), a 1927 American silent horror film
 The Wizard (1989 film), a 1989 American film about a skilled video gamer
 Wizards (film), a 1977 animated post-apocalyptic fantasy/science fiction film by Ralph Bakshi

Gaming 
 Wizard (1983 video game), a 1983 Commodore 64 game that was later re-released in 1986 as Ultimate Wizard
 Wizard (2005 video game), a game designed by Chris Crawford for the Atari 2600 and released in 2005
 Wizard (board game), a 1978 board game released by Metagaming
 Wizard (card game), a trick-taking card game

 Wizard (MUD), a developer or administrator in a MUD
 Wizards (board game), a board game produced in 1982 by Avalon Hill
 Wizards of the Coast or Wizards, a Seattle-based games publisher

Literature
 Wizard (novel), a 1980 science fiction novel by John Varley
 The Wizard (novel), an 1896 Adventure novel by Henry Rider Haggard
 The Wizard, a novel by Gene Wolfe in the series The Wizard Knight
 Wizards (anthology), an anthology of fantasy short fiction edited by Jack Dann and Gardner Dozois

Music

Groups
 Wizard (German band), a German power metal/speed metal band
 Wizard (American band), a short-lived American psychedelic/hard rock band
 WZRD (band), alternative rock duo formerly known as Wizard

Albums 
 Wizard (EP), an EP by Beto Vázquez Infinity
 The Wizard (album), the second album by American blues guitarist Mel Brown
 WZRD (album), the eponymous debut album by American alternative rock duo WZRD
 The Wizrd, the seventh studio album by American rapper Future
 Oṣó (Yoruba: The Wizard), the sixth studio album by Nigerian singer Brymo

Songs 
 "The Wizard" (Black Sabbath song), 1970
 "The Wizard" (Paul Hardcastle song), 1986
 "The Wizard" (Uriah Heep song), 1972
 "Wizard" (Martin Garrix and Jay Hardway song), 2013
 "The Wizard", a song by Bat for Lashes from Fur and Gold
 "The Wizard", a song by Albert Ayler from Spiritual Unity
 "The Wizard", a single by Marc Bolan
 "The Wizard", a song by Paul Espinoza of Golden Bough
 "The Wizard", a song by Al Di Meola from Land of the Midnight Sun
 "The Wizard", a song by Madness from Wonderful

Other uses in music 
 Wizard, an Australian record label created by Robie Porter

Television
 "Wizard" (Adventure Time episode)
 The Wizard (TV series), a short-lived 1980s CBS television series
 "The Wizard" (Seinfeld), the 171st episode of the NBC sitcom Seinfeld
 "The Wizard", an episode of She-Ra: Princess of Power
 Wizards: Tales of Arcadia, a 2020 TV series

Other uses in arts, entertainment and media
 Wizard (magazine), a magazine about comic books
 The Wizard (DC Thomson), a British comic that featured Wilson of the Wizard and was merged to Rover

People

 The Wizard (nickname), shared by several notable people
 Wizard of New Zealand, also known as The Wizard, New Zealand educator, comedian and politician Ian Brackenbury Channell (born 1932)

Science and technology
 HTC Wizard, a QWERTY-keyboard pocket PC
 Sharp Wizard, a personal organizer released in 1988
 Wizard (software), a computer user interface that leads a user through dialog steps
 Wizard butterfly, the brush-footed or Bardic wizard butterfly Rhinopalpa polynice
 Wizard Nebula, an open cluster located in Cepheus constellation

Sports 
 Wizard (horse) (1806–1813), Thoroughbred racehorse
 Canterbury cricket team, known as the Wizards
 Dakota Wizards, a team in the NBA Development League
 Fort Wayne Wizards, a team in the Midwest League of professional baseball
 Kansas City Wizards, the former name of Sporting Kansas City, a Major League Soccer team
 Washington Wizards, a National Basketball Association (NBA) team
 Yomiuri Open, a golf tournament in Japan known as the Wizard between 1970 and 1978

Transport
 Wizard, a GWR Iron Duke Class steam locomotive
 FV Wizard, a crab fishing boat in the TV show Deadliest Catch
 Hillman Wizard, an American six-cylinder car
 HMS Wizard, a list of ships bearing the name
 Isuzu Wizard, a Japanese mid-size SUV
 Laron Wizard, an American homebuilt aircraft design

Other uses
 Comp wizard, also known as a Comp hustler, is a gambler who maximizes complementary perqs from casinos
 Grand Wizard or Imperial Wizard, a leader of the Ku Klux Klan
 Wizard Video, a defunct home video company

See also 
 The Wizzard, Dominican calypso singer
 Wizzard, a 1970s British glam rock band
 Wiz (disambiguation)
 Wizard Cup (disambiguation)
 WZRD (disambiguation)
 
 

fi:Velho (täsmennyssivu)